Witkowo (is a town in Gniezno County, Greater Poland Voivodeship, Poland, located southeast of Poznań.

Witkowo is one of the production sites of the Greater Poland liliput cheese (ser liliput wielkopolski), a traditional regional Polish cheese, protected as a traditional food by the Ministry of Agriculture and Rural Development of Poland.

References

External links 
 

Cities and towns in Greater Poland Voivodeship
Gniezno County